Nocturnal Animals is a 2016 American neo-noir psychological thriller film written, co-produced and directed by Tom Ford. Starring Amy Adams, Jake Gyllenhaal, Michael Shannon and Aaron Taylor-Johnson, the film focuses on the gripping story of a broken-hearted man who wreaks vengeance on his ex-wife decades later with his unpublished novel. The film had its world premiere at the Venice Film Festival on September 2, 2016 and was released to theaters on November 18, 2016. The film was released to positive reviews, with Rotten Tomatoes gave an approval rating of 74%, based on 237 reviews, with an average rating of 7/10 and Metacritic gave a score of 67 out of 100, based on 45 reviews.

Nocturnal Animals received an Academy Award for Best Supporting Actor nomination for Shannon at the 89th Academy Awards. The film received nine nominations at the 70th British Academy Film Awards, including Best Actor in a Leading Role for Gyllenhaal, Best Actor in a Supporting Role for Taylor-Johnson, Best Direction, Best Adapted Screenplay, Best Cinematography, Best Editing, Best Film Music, Best Production Design and Best Makeup and Hair. The film received three nominations at the 22nd Critics' Choice Awards, including Best Supporting Actor for Shannon, Best Adapted Screenplay and Best Cinematography. The film won the Best Supporting Actor – Motion Picture for Taylor-Johnson and was nominated for Best Director and Best Screenplay at the 74th Golden Globe Awards. The film also received three nominations at the 21st Satellite Awards, including Best Film, Best Director and Best Actress for Adams.

Accolades

Notes

References

External links 
 

Lists of accolades by film
Horror film lists